Cătălin Bălescu (born January 6, 1962) is a Romanian visual artist and a university professor at the Department of Painting of The National University of Arts in Bucharest.

Bălescu is the rector of The National University of Arts in Bucharest (elected in 2012). He is a member of the permanent staff of the Doctoral Studies section within The National University of Arts in Bucharest, and has coordinated doctoral dissertations ever since 2010.

Cătălin Bălescu has been a member of The Visual Artists’ Union of Romania (U.A.P) since 1990.

Education
Cătălin Bălescu was born at Brad, Hunedoara County, Romania.  In 1986 he graduated from the “Nicolae Grigorescu” Plastic Arts Institute, where he had studied between 1981 and 1986. Prior to that, he had studied at the High School of Arts in Deva, Hunedoara, Romania.

Scientific and didactic activity
Cătălin Bălescu has been teaching at the Department of Painting of The National University of Arts in Bucharest since 1990. He started his academic career as an assistant professor, between 1990 and 1997, at the class of Professors Sorin Ilfoveanu, Florin Mitroi, Vasile Grigore. 
In 1998 he became a university lecturer at the Department of Painting of The National University of Arts in Bucharest. 
In 2003 Cătălin Bălescu became a doctor in visual arts (artis doctor), by successfully defending his thesis entitled Grammar Elements of Visual Art Imagery: ImageSyntax, published by Printech Publishing House, 2004, .

Between 2005 and 2009 he was an associate professor at the Department of Painting of The National University of Arts in Bucharest. In 2009 he earned his title of university professor.

During 1995–1996 Cătălin Bălescu coordinated the Studio 35 (Atelier 35) section of The Visual Artists’ Union of Romania( U.A.P) .

Ever since 1996 Cătălin Bălescu has been involved in organizing activities with students groups of the Department of Painting. From 1990 to 2000 he worked as a Scientific Secretary of the Department of Painting of The National University of Arts. Between 2000 and 2004 he was appointed Scientific Secretary of the Faculty of Fine Arts of The National University of Arts in Bucharest. In 2004 Cătălin Bălescu was appointed Scientific Secretary of the Senate of The National University of Arts in Bucharest, Romania.

As far as scientific activity is concerned, starting with 2004 Cătălin Bălescu has been the ARTLAB Director (i.e. of the Laboratory for Artistic Image Analysis and Creation), acknowledged by CA 37/2004 of The National Council of Scientific Research (the NCSR, i.e. the CNCS).

Among the research projects in which he has taken active part there is the Type A NCSR – 1/2000, Research Concerning Advanced Techniques of Artistic Imagery Analysis, carried out in partnership with the Department of Mathematics of the Faculty of Cybernetics of [Bucharest University of Economic Studies] (AES) (see The AES Informatics Review 17/2001).

From 2002 to 2004 Cătălin Bălescu participated in the PED Project/ CERES Program/National Plan for Development, entitled An Analysis Method of Fundamental Elements of ArtisticImagery, carried out in partnership with The National Institute for Research and Development in Optoelectronics NIOE 2000. 
Between 2006 and 2008 Cătălin Bălescu was involved in a program of providing graduation equipment for laboratories, administered by The National Ministry of Education. In 2008 he got involved in theCEX 05D8-02-2 project entitled eMart-Cyber Museumof Arts Universities in Romania.

Cătălin Bălescu is a member of the JAQM Advisory Board (Journal of Applied Quantitative Methods).

Personal exhibitions

 2006 – at The Apollo Gallery in Bucharest, Romania
 2003 – at TheSimeza Gallery in Bucharest
 2000 – at TheSimeza Gallery in Bucharest
 1997 – at The Apollo Gallery in Bucharest
 1994 – at The Simeza Gallery in Bucharest

Group exhibitions (a selection)

 2013 – The Painting Salon, at The Visual Arts Center in Bucharest, Romania
 2013, May – Ten + (Zece +) at The Visual Arts Center in Bucharest
 2013, April – VENATURE XXV, at The Visual Arts Center in Bucharest
 2012 – UNARTE 012: The Department of Painting Exhibition, at The Museum of Arts in Cluj- Napoca, Cluj County, Romania
 2012 – Arts in Bucharest, at The Visual Arts Center in Bucharest
 2012 – Culture of Cosmos, at The Parliament Hall in Bucharest
 2012, January – Eleven + (Unsprezece +) at The Visual Arts Center in Bucharest
 2011 – Group Exhibition at The Plastic Artists Union Gallery in Iaşi, Iaşi County, Romania
 2011 – Thirteen (Treisprezece) at The Visual Arts Center in Bucharest
 2011 – …After Cremaster, at The Visual Arts Center in Bucharest
 2010 – Studio Instances II, at The Visual Arts Center in Bucharest
 2009 – TEN (ZECE), at The Visual Arts Center in Bucharest
 2009 – Studio Instances I, at The Visual Arts Center in Bucharest 
 2008 – The Andalusian Dog, at The Artis Gallery in Bucharest
 2008 – Drawing Group Exhibition at The Simeza Gallery in Bucharest 
 2003 – The Municipal Salon at The Artis Gallery in Bucharest
 2001 – Group Exhibition at The Căminul Artei Gallery, at the 1st Floor in Bucharest 
 2001 – The National Arts Salon at The Exhibition Pavilion in Bucharest
 1999 – Time in Space Arts, at The Institute of Architecture in Bucharest
 1995 – Group Exhibition at The Apollo Gallery in Bucharest
 1995, March – Object vs. Objectivity, at the Studio 35 (Atelier 35) in Bucharest
 1995, February – New Avant-Garde vs. New Traditionalism, at the Studio 35 in Bucharest
 1995, January – Power vs. Powerlessness, at the Studio 35 in Bucharest
 1994, 1992, 1990, 1988, 1987 – Youth Exhibition, at The National Theater in Bucharest (TNB)
 1988 – The Annual Graphics Exhibition, at The Dalles Hall in Bucharest
 1996, 1995, 1994, 1993, 1992, 1985 – The Municipal Exhibition at The National Theater in Bucharest (TNB)
 1983 – Sketches, Students’ Exhibition, in Bucharest

International exhibitions

 2012 – The International Triennial of Drawing and Engraving –3rdEdition, Bangkok, Thailand
 2001 – The International Biennial of Drawing and Engraving, Taipei, Taiwan
 2000 – Yungersted&Brostrom Gallery, Copenhagen, Denmark
 1997 – The International Arts Biennial, Sharjah, Arabian Emirates Union
 1995 – Rhein Main Maritime Hotel, Darmstadt, Germany
 1995 – The Romanian Cultural Centers in Vienna (Austria), Budapest (Hungary), Venice (Italy)
 1995 – The International Painting Festival, CagnessurMer, France
 1990 – An Itinerant Exhibition; ISELP, Bruxelles; Botanique Gallery, Bruxelles, Belgium; The Romanian Library in Paris, France
 1989 – The International Miniature Festival, 4th Edition, Galleria Del Bello, Toronto, Canada

Prizes, awards, scholarships, grants

 1997 – Scholarship from The Italian Cultural Institute in Bucharest; traveling to study in Rome, Florence, Venice – Italy
 1993 – Tempus Scholarship for Bath College of Higher Education, UK 
 1988 – Costin Petrescu Scholarship from the Plastic Artists Union, Romania

Articles, books, book illustration
 Zhang S., Neagu D. and Bălescu C., ”Refinement of Clustering Solutions Using a Multi-Label 
Voting Algorithm for Neuro-Fuzzy Ensembles,” Procs. of The First International Conference on Natural Computation ICNC 2005 (Lipo Wang, Ke Chen, Yew S. Ong, eds.) Changsha, China, 2005, Springer Verlag Lecture Notes in Computer Science LNCS3612, pp. 1300 –1303,  
 Zhang S. and Bălescu C., “A Multi-Label Voting Algorithm for Neuro-Fuzzy Classifiers Ensembles Applied for Visual Arts Data Mining,” Procs. of The 5th International Conference on Intelligent Systems Design and Applications ISDA 2005, (HalinaKwasnicka, Marcin Paprycki, eds.), Wroclaw, Poland, 2005, IEEE Computer Society Press, pp. 245–250,  
 Zhang S., Neagu D., Bălescu C., “Knowledge Representation for Visual Art Data Mining,” The 6th 	Informatics Workshop for Research Students, Univ. of Bradford, 23 March 2005,pp. 198–202,  
 Zhang S., Neagu D., Bălescu C., “Visual Art Data Mining: Knowledge Representation and a Case Study,” PREP 2005: The EPSRC Postgraduate Research Conference in Electronics, Photonics, Communications and Networks, and Computing Science at the University of Lancaster, March 30– April 1, 2005, pp. 295–296
 Bălescu, Cătălin, Graphic Design to the volume of Sorin Ilfoveanu, Studio Notes 1985 – 2009, Vols. I – VI, 2009
 Bălescu, Cătălin, Graphic Design to the volume of Sorin Ilfoveanu, Studio 1995 – 2010, UNARTE Publishing House, 2010, 
 Bălescu, Cătălin, Graphic Design to the volume The Kalinderu Heritage: Ruins of a Museum, UNARTE Publishing House,  
 Bălescu, Cătălin, General Editor & Project Coordinator, The National University of Arts Museum, UNARTE Publishing House, 2008,

References

Bibliography 
 Cătălin Bălescu, President of UNARTE, invited to A Word about Culture, Radio România Cultural – https://web.archive.org/web/20150725232549/http://www.radioromaniacultural.ro/rectorul_unarte_catalin_balescu_invitat_la_vorba_de_cultura-9941
 CĂTĂLIN BĂLESCU, “Painting, The Simeza Gallery” – 1994 – 2000 – 2004 – UNARTE Publishing House, 2007
 CĂTĂLIN BĂLESCU, “Painting, The Apollo Gallery” – 2006 – UNARTE Publishing House, 2007
 Catalog of the National University of Arts in Bucharest, UNARTE Publishing House, 2006 (member of the coordinating team of editors)
 Catalog of the National Salon of Arts 2006, edited by the Plastic Artists Union of Romania, financial support by AFCN, 
 The UNARTE 011 Catalog, The Visual Arts Center, UNARTE Publishing House, Bucharest, 2011,  
 The Catalog of The Thirteen Exhibition, The Visual Arts Center, UNARTE Publishing House, Bucharest 2011, 
 The UNARTE 012 Catalog, The Visual Arts Center, UNARTE Publishing House, Bucharest 2011, 
 The Arts in Bucharest Catalog,the 2nd Edition, The Visual Arts Center, UNARTE Publishing House, Bucharest 2011, 
 The Arts in Bucharest Catalog, the 3rd Edition, The Visual Arts Center, UNARTE Publishing House, Bucharest 2012, 
 The 11+ Exhibition Catalog, The Visual Arts Center, UNARTE Publishing House, Bucharest 2012, 
 The 10+ Exhibition Catalog, The Visual Arts Center, UNARTE Publishing House, Bucharest, 2013, 
 The CagnessurMer International Painting Festival Catalog, the 27th Edition, Ed. by The Ministry of Culture in France and UNESCO, 1995 
 The 10th International Biennial Print and Drawing Exhibition Catalog, Ed. by Taipei Fine Arts Museum Council for Cultural Affairs Taiwan, Taipei, 2001
 The 3rdTrienniale International Print and Drawing Exhibition Catalog, Ed by Art and Culture Office Bangkok – Thailand, 2012
 https://web.archive.org/web/20140116094117/http://www.romanialibera.ro/cultura/arte-vizuale/un-secol-si-jumatate-de-invatamant-de-arta-322807.html
 The BIEFF 2013 International Festival Catalog, the online version – http://www.bieff.ro/upload/CatalogBIEFF2013.pdf
 Artist’s Works presented in auction – http://www.artnet.com/artists/catalin-balescu/past-auction-results
 Cătălin Bălescu’s Exhibition at the National Theater, by AncaVlada, The National Courier – 
 Venature XXV, Mihai Plămădeală, Observatorul Cultural– http://www.observatorcultural.ro/ARTE-VIZUALE-Venature-XXV*articleID_28601-articles_details.html
 The New Rectors of Bucharest Universities,Adevarul – http://adevarul.ro/news/bucuresti/cine-noii-rectori-universitatilor-bucurestene-1_50bdeca87c42d5a663d022f0/index.html
 The National University of Arts in Bucharest at Its 150th Anniversary, Observatorul Cultural – http://www.observatorcultural.ro/*id_4916-news_details.html
 Quality Parameters in the Aesthetic Analysis of Artistic Image, The ESA Economic Informatic Review 17/2001 – https://web.archive.org/web/20140225055650/http://revistaie.ase.ro/content/17/cocianu.pdf

External links 
 The National Museum of Arts of Romania – http://www.mnar.arts.ro
 The National Museum of Contemporary Art – http://www.mnac.ro
 Cătălin Bălescu’s Official Artist’s Site – http://www.balescu.com/
 The National University of Arts Official Site – http://www.unarte.org
 https://web.archive.org/web/20170913123319/http://iqinart.ro/
 http://www.3a.ro
 https://www.researchgate.net/profile/Catalin_Balescu/stats/?pli=1&loginT=ULi-wXozrarQOX1mkklOQUBafJy83mrWzoQ8KFVzsA*&cp=re284_n_p2001&ch=reg

1962 births
Romanian artists
Living people
People from Brad, Hunedoara